There are approximately 1,500 characters in the Valiant universe.

#
1-A

A
Aesha
Alaric
Alloy
Amelia 
Ms. Ando
Andromeda
Andy
Dutchess Angelique D’Terre
Animalia
Anvil (Samuel Coleman)
Archer (Obadiah Archer)
Armstrong (Aram)
Aric of Dacia (X-O Manowar)
Aristides
Armorines
Atomus
Ax

B
Balaam
Bazooka 
Bear
Benito Carboni
Doctor Bev
Big Mean Monkey Head
Bionisaurs (Dinosoid)
Blast 
Bloodshot (Angelo Mortalli)
Blowhard
Blur  Parker Matthews
Boaz
Boogieman
Buck McHenry (Geomancer of 1889)

C
Calamity a.k.a. Jane Ngo
Camouflage
Carmen Ruiz a.k.a. Carmen Mirage (Crazy Legs)
Carrera
Cinder [Marco Rosetti]
Chan
Charly Donovan
Chichak
Claiburne
Clay McHenry
Clemenceau
Coach Heinz
Cobrah
Colin King (Ninjak)
Constance Allen
Costantino
Crescendo
Crimson Dragon

D
Daddy
Danae Delsol
Daryl 
Deidre Dacia
Destroyer a.k.a. Solar the Destroyer
Devon 
Doctor Eclipse (Fred Bender)
Doctor Lawrence Heyward
Doctor Mirage (Hwen Mirage)
Doctor Mirage (Shan Fong Mirage)
Doctor Ralphonse Pinto 
Doctor Silk
Diseased Squirrel
Dragonfly

E
Earth Angel (Teresa)
Eddy Donovan 
Eel
Elya
Elzy
Emil Sosa
Enrico
Emile N’Dour
Erica Pierce (Mothergod)
Eternal Warrior (Gilad Anni-Padda, Gilad Abrams)

F
Fire Angel (Gianna)
Fitzhugh
Flamingo (Charlene Dupre)
Flashbulb
Flatline 
Flo
Fluffy
Fort
Frost
Frank Arcko 
Frendy

G
Gafti
Gamin
General Cheng
Geomancers
Geoff McHenry (Geomancer of 1992)
Ghost
Glyder [Leigh Rosetti]
Graal
Grandmother
Gregor Latinev
Gryffen
Gumball 
Gunslinger (Charles Palmer) of H.A.R.D. Corps

H
H8
Hammerhead (Chris Eastman) of H.A.R.D. Corps
Harbinger, The
Harbingers
Harry Donovan 
Hazey 
Headbutt
Doctor Heyward
Hook
Hotshot
Hotwire 
Hydrich

I
Ilysee
Immortal Enemy
Inga Dacia
Ishmael
Ivar, the Timewalker
Izak

J
Jack Boniface (Shadowman)
Jillian Alcott
Jim 
Reverend Joe Earl Archer 
Joe Irons
Jolt (Victoria Martinelli)
June Schneider
Juan Javier Caldone

K
Ken Clarkson
King Crab
Kris Hathaway
Krytos

L
Lana Heffner
Lauren (the stripper)
Law
Laws
Lazlo Noel
Leeja Clane
Livewire (Amanda McKee) 
Longhunter (Israel Crockett)
Lord of the Fleas
Lounge Lizard
Lucinda Mendez (Geomancer of 2062)
Lummox 
Lump
Lydia Polk

M
M’rrha (Maria)
Mad Cow
Mademoiselle Noir
Magnus, Robot Fighter
Magskrag
Mahmud
Makiko Minashi
Mallak
Maniac of H.A.R.D. Corps
Malev Emperor
Malevolents
Mallik 
Map Giver 
Marcia
Marty
Mary Donovan 
Master Darque
Mama Nettie
Max St. James
Medoc the Red
Megan
Midnight Earl (Earl Simkus)
Mimsey
Mitch Donovan 
Monique Lynn Levingston
Mothergod
Mosquito
Mother Nike
Mr. Twister

N
Nettie
Neville Alcott
Ninjak

O
Obadia
Outback

P
Para-Man
Para-Man 2
Paul Bouvier (Alloy) 
Paul N’Dours
Perp of H.A.R.D. Corps
Peter Stanchek (Pete) a.k.a. Sting
Phaze
Pol-Bekhara
Prather
Prick
Prince Albert
Psi-Lords
Puff

Q
Quantum
Queen

R
Rachel Hopson
Rage
Rai
Rampage
Randy Cartier
Ravenrok
Ravenwing
Regan Howell
Rebound a.k.a. Zach Helvin
Rentaro Nakadai (41st Rai)
Rexo
Ripsaw
Robert Folly
Rock (Joe Nicoletti)
Rockland Tate (Geomancer of the 41st Century)
Rolf (Dacia)
Rollergirl 
Rotwak
Rubberneck

S
Samedi
Sandria Darque
Sarathan
Sarus
Savage (Kevin Sauvage)
Scott
Screen
Secret Weapons
Shadowman
Shakespeare (Aaron Brillstein) of H.A.R.D. Corps
Shanhara (original X-O Manowar Armor)
Shatiqua
Siamese Fighting Fish
Silk
Silvio  
Sinclaire (Para-Man 2)
Sisters of Doom
Skammrs
Skindome 
Slagger
Sniper 
Solar
Sonix (Gaylord Butch McFadden)
Sosa The Undying
Sparrow
Spider Alien
Spikeman
Spuds 
Spylocke (Ananse)
Sting
Stronghold (Edward T. Sedgwick)
Storm Angel (Maria)
Suki Seki
Superstar (Ricky Silver)
Swallow

T
T-1
Takao Konishi
Takashi Nakadai
Tank
Taser
Tashi Khatun (Geomancer)
Tekla
Teresa Giardino
Tetsuwan Nucleo
Thelma Archer
Thomas Morgan
Thumper
Timbuc (York Timbuc)
Ting ( Master Ting)
Tintorrera
Todd Bevins
Tohru Nakadai (42nd Rai)
Tonguelasher
Torque (John Torkelson)
Torque Clane (Magnus's son)
Toyo Harada
Trenchmouth
Trinity Angels
Tsetse
Turok
Twin Bill
Two-Face
Tyger (Mira Choudhury)

U
Über-Sasquatch
Ularu  The White Goddess
Una
Uzzi the Clown

V
Vekter
Vincent Van Goat
Vise
The Visitor
Victor Zeramiah Clane
Viva

W
Wassily Borkov  The White Wolf
Weasel
Welt
William Ackerman
Willie Maye (Mae)
Willis (Willy)
Willow Talltree
Winged Cerebrum
Wipeout of H.A.R.D. Corps
Wisp
Woody (Henderson  Woody Van Chelton)
Woody 2
Wormfeeder

X
XL a.k.a. Christine Helvin
X-O Manowar
X-O Commando (Kazuyo Nakadai)
Xyrkol

Y
Yuri Pierce (Geomancer of 2900)

Z
Zephyr (Faith Herbert)

References

Lists of fictional characters